Paradonea presleyi is a species of araneomorph spiders in the family Eresidae.

Distribution 
This species is found in Zimbabwe and South Africa.

Description 

The male holotype has white setae concentrated in the thoracic and eye regions. The cephalic region is semicircular, wider than it is long, and moderately raised. The chelicerae are contiguous mesally, with a lateral boss. The legs have patches and longitudinal bands of white setae. Femur I is slightly thickened with a thick brush of dark setae; there are rows of distal ventral macrosetae on metatarsus I–IV, and a few scattered ventral macrosetae on tarsus I–IV and metatarsus II–IV. The dorsum of the abdomen has two longitudinal stripes of white hairs which are parallel anteriorly, diverge posteriorly, before connecting by transverse portion. The median part is medium brown, with the ectal and posterior parts being dark brown.

The male palp have proximal-distal axis. The tegulum is subrectangular, and the conductor and embolus together form an apical complex moving distally. The conductor is moderately sclerotized and broad with a helical ridge fringed with distinct papillae, and hooked distally. Tegular division is slightly longer than the embolic division. The cymbium has several prolateral macrosetae.

No information has been published about the female of the species.

Etymology 
A patronymic in honor of Elvis Presley, described by Miller et al. as the "king of rock and roll and subject of innumerable black velvet paintings”

See also 
 List of organisms named after famous people (born 1900–1949)
 Preseucoela imallshookupis, a species of wasp also named after Elvis Presley

References 

Elvis Presley
Eresidae
Spiders described in 2012
Spiders of Africa